Fox Networks Group Portugal (registered as The Walt Disney Company Portugal Tf, Unipessoal, Lda formerly FNG Portugal, Lda.) was created in 2003 with headquarters located in Lisbon, Portugal, and is the owner of many Portuguese versions of Fox.

Channels

Current
Fox (HD)
Fox Life (HD)
Fox Crime (HD)
Fox Comedy (HD)
Fox Movies (HD)
National Geographic Channel (HD)
Nat Geo Wild (European TV channel) (HD)
24 Kitchen (HD)
BabyTV

Former
Fuel TV (Portugal) (HD, sold to FYC)
BemSimples (defunct)
Nat Geo Music (defunct)
Fox News Channel
Sky News (formerly distributed, owned by Sky)
Phoenix Chinese News and Entertainment Channel
Phoenix InfoNews Channel
Nat Geo People (defunct)

See also
Fox Networks Group
Fox Entertainment Group

References

External links
Official website 
Official website 

Portugal
Television channels and stations established in 2003